USS Redfish has been the name of  more than one United States Navy ship, and may refer to:

 , later AGSS-395, a submarine in commission from 1944 to 1968
 USS Redfish (SSN-680), the original name planned for an attack submarine renamed  in 1969 prior to the beginning of construction

United States Navy ship names